Dorothy Rose may refer to:

 Dot Rose (born 1938), Canadian curler and softball player
 Dorothy H. Rose (1920–2005), American politician from New York